Priyamanasam is a 2015 Indian Sanskrit-language drama film directed by Vinod Mankara. It is based on the life of writer Unnayi Variyar and his 17th-century kathakali play (attakatha) Nalacharitham. The play is a recension of Nala and Damayanti, an episode in the Indian epic Mahabharata.

Made in Kerala, it was the third Sanskrit film and the first in 22 years. It received the Best Sanskrit Feature Film Award at the 63rd National Film Awards.

Plot
Set in 17th century Kerala, Priyamanasam is about the final years in the life of poet Unnayi Variyar as he struggles to complete his magnum opus Nalacharitham Aattakatha.

References

External links
 Official website

Sanskrit-language films
2015 films
Films set in the 17th century
Indian biographical films
2010s biographical films
Indian films based on plays
Films based on the Mahabharata